Finally We Are No One is the second studio album by Icelandic band Múm. It was released on 20 May 2002 by FatCat Records.

In Iceland, the Smekkleysa label released Loksins erum við engin, a limited edition of Finally We Are No One featuring alternate versions of the album's songs recorded in the Icelandic language.

Production
Múm worked on Finally We Are No One in Galtarviti, a lighthouse in the Westfjords. Inside the lighthouse, the band composed songs for the album, which they subsequently recorded in a studio. Explaining why they decided to work in Galtarviti, Múm member Gunnar Örn Tynes said:

Critical reception

Hot Press critic James Kelleher described Finally We Are No One as "a luscious 56-minute lullaby for troubled heads, sung quietly and played with delicate precision." Q found the album "utterly unique" and highlighted Múm's "curious combination of bright-eyed playfulness and maudlin moods", while in Rolling Stone, Jon Caramanica commented that the band "find majestic sounds in unlikely places." Cam Lindsay of Exclaim! wrote, "Glitches, moody organs and slow, heavy beats are thrown all over the place, mixed in with some of the most magical sounds, which seem as though they are covered in pixie dust." Pitchforks Mark Richardson said that a few songs "grate with their simple-minded sweetness", but "a handful of others are excellent."

In 2016, Paste ranked Finally We Are No One at number 11 on its list of the 50 best post-rock albums.

Track listing
All tracks are written by Örvar Þóreyjarson Smárason, Gunnar Örn Tynes, Gyða Valtýsdóttir and Kristín Anna Valtýsdóttir.

Personnel
Credits are adapted from the album's liner notes.

Additional musicians
 Helga Þóra Björgvinsdóttir – violin and viola on "I Can't Feel My Hand Any More, It's Alright, Sleep Still"
 Anna Hugadóttir – violin and viola on "I Can't Feel My Hand Any More, It's Alright, Sleep Still"
 Orri Jónsson – organ
 Ingrid Karlsdóttir – violin and viola on "I Can't Feel My Hand Any More, It's Alright, Sleep Still"
 Samuli Kosminen – drums, percussion
 Eiríkur Orri Ólafsson – trumpet

Production
 Orri Jónsson – recording
 Valgeir Sigurðsson – mixing, recording

Charts

References

External links
 
 

2002 albums
Múm albums
FatCat Records albums